Savemoney (sometimes stylized as SaveMoney or SAVEMONEY) is a hip hop collective originating in Chicago, Illinois. It was founded by Chicago rapper Vic Mensa.

Members
 Vic Mensa
 Chance the Rapper
 Nico Segal
 Towkio
 Joey Purp
 Kami
 Brian Fresco
 Dally Auston
 Caleb James
 Sterling Hayes

References

External links
 

American hip hop groups
Hip hop collectives
Musical groups from Chicago